Laksitha Rasanjana (born 21 November 1998) is a Sri Lankan cricketer. He made his List A debut on 14 December 2019, for Negombo Cricket Club in the 2019–20 Invitation Limited Over Tournament.

References

External links
 

1998 births
Living people
Sri Lankan cricketers
Negombo Cricket Club cricketers
Place of birth missing (living people)